

Timeline

Systems

Hurricane One

Hurricane Two

Hurricane Three

Hurricane Four 

Hurricane San Martín of 1889

Hurricane Five

Hurricane Six

Tropical Storm Seven

Tropical Storm Eight

Tropical Storm Nine

See also 

 List of Atlantic hurricanes
 Atlantic hurricane season

References

External links 
 HURDAT Data for the 1889 Atlantic hurricane season

 
Articles which contain graphical timelines
1889 natural disasters
1889 meteorology